Katanvogo is a Senufo village in northern Ivory Coast. It is located about twenty kilometers southwest of Korhogo, halfway between Dassingboho and Pinyon, in the sub-prefecture of Tioroniaradougou, Korhogo Department, Poro Region, Savanes District. 

The main activity of the inhabitants is agriculture and livestock-raising. The population is in the low thousands.

Populated places in Savanes District
Populated places in Poro Region